Martin Frk (born 5 October 1993) is a Czech professional ice hockey forward currently playing for the Springfield Thunderbirds in the American Hockey League (AHL) while under contract to the St. Louis Blues of the National Hockey League (NHL). Frk was drafted 49th overall by the Detroit Red Wings in the 2012 NHL Entry Draft.

Playing career

Junior
During the 2009–10 season, Martin Frk was the leading scorer for HC Energie Karlovy Vary (juniors) in the Czech Extraliga. Frk recorded 28 goals and 30 assists and had a league-leading 186 penalty minutes in 41 games. Frk scored two goals and three assists in five playoff games. He played eight games with HC Karlovy Vary U18 and scored nine goals and assists. Frk was drafted 24th overall in the 2010 KHL Junior Draft by HC Yugra. The Halifax Mooseheads drafted him 3rd overall in the CHL Import Draft.

During the 2010–11 QMJHL season, Frk was the second-leading scorer for Halifax in his first season in North America. Frk recorded 22 goals and 28 assists in 62 games with the Mooseheads. Halifax reached the QMJHL playoffs despite winning just 20 games. In the four-game first-round series against Montreal, Frk had two assists.

In the 2011–12 QMJHL season, Frk suffered a concussion in the pre-season that kept him out until December but he had a strong second half as the Mooseheads were one of the QMJHL's big turnaround stories. Frk recorded 16 goals and 13 assists in 34 games. Halifax finished second to powerhouse Saint John in the Maritimes Division and advanced to the playoff semifinals. In 17 playoff games Frk scored five goals and six assists. Frk was invited to the NHL Draft Combine and ranked 20th amongst North American skaters in Central Scouting's final rankings prior to the 2012 NHL Draft.

During the 2012–13 QMJHL season, Frk skated for the Memorial Cup champion Halifax Mooseheads. Frk was the second-leading scorer for Halifax in his third season, recording 35 goals and 49 assists in 56 regular-season games. The Mooseheads had the QMJHL's best record and defeated Baie-Comeau in the league finals. Frk scored 13 goals and 20 assist in 17 playoff games. Frk was fourth among all scorers at the Memorial Cup, finishing with five goals and four assists in four games. The Mooseheads defeated WHL champion Portland Winterhawks in the Memorial Cup Finals.

Professional
On 31 July 2012, the Detroit Red Wings signed Frk to a three-year entry-level contract. Frk played within the Red Wings affiliates, the Grand Rapids Griffins and Toledo Walleye for the duration of his entry-level deal.

Prior to the 2016–17 season, Frk was claimed off waivers by the Carolina Hurricanes on 9 October 2016. Remaining on the Hurricanes roster, Frk made his NHL debut in a 3–2 defeat to the Edmonton Oilers on 18 October 2016. By making his debut, Frk became the first player in NHL history to not have a vowel in his last name. He appeared in one more game, against his former club, the Detroit Red Wings, before on 1 November 2016, he returned to Detroit after he was re-claimed on waivers from the Hurricanes. The Red Wings reassigned him to their AHL affiliate club, the Grand Rapids Griffins.

On 18 July 2017, the Red Wings signed Frk to a one-year contract extension. On 30 September 2017, it was announced Frk had made the season-opening roster for the Red Wings. On 5 October 2017, Frk scored his first career NHL goal against Devan Dubnyk of the Minnesota Wild. During the 2017–18 season, in his first full NHL season, Frk recorded 11 goals and 14 assists in 68 games. On 25 June 2018, the Red Wings signed Frk to a one-year contract extension. Frk was the recipient of the Red Wings/Detroit Sports Media 2018 Rookie of the Year Award, select annually by DSM members.

On February 14, 2019, Frk was assigned to the Grand Rapids Griffins. Prior to being assigned to the Griffins, he recorded one goal and four assists in 25 games for the Red Wings. During the 2018–19 season, Frk recorded one goal and five assists in 30 games for the Red Wings. Following the completion of the Red Wings' season, he was re-assigned to the Griffins.

On July 1, 2019, Frk signed as a free agent to a one-year, two-way contract with the Los Angeles Kings.

Frk participated in the 2020 AHL All-Star Classic, where he won the hardest shot contest with a 109.2 mph slapshot, breaking Zdeno Chára's record for the fastest shot ever recorded.

As a free agent after three seasons within the Kings organization, Frk was signed to a one-year, two-way contract with the St. Louis Blues on July 15, 2022.

International play
Frk represented the Czech Republic at the 2010 IIHF World U18 Championships. Frk shared the team lead in points for the sixth-place Czechs at the U18 WJC with two goals and five assists in six games.

Frk represented the Czech Republic at the 2011 World Junior Ice Hockey Championships and 2011 IIHF World U18 Championships. At the U20 WJC, Frk led all players in the tournament with 31 penalty minutes and was the seventh-place Czech team's second-leading scorer with three goals and three assists in six games. Frk and Dmitri Jaškin were the leading scorers for the Czechs at the U18 WJC with five points each. Frk scored one goal and four assists as the Czechs finished eighth.

Frk represented the Czech Republic at the 2013 World Junior Ice Hockey Championships. At the WJHC, Frk recorded three goals and one assist in six games.

Career statistics

Regular season and playoffs

International

Awards and honours

References

External links

1993 births
Living people
Carolina Hurricanes players
Czech expatriate ice hockey players in Canada
Czech expatriate ice hockey players in the United States
Czech ice hockey right wingers
Detroit Red Wings draft picks
Detroit Red Wings players
Grand Rapids Griffins players
Halifax Mooseheads players
Los Angeles Kings players
Ontario Reign (AHL) players
People from Pelhřimov
Springfield Thunderbirds players
Toledo Walleye players
Sportspeople from the Vysočina Region